was a municipality in Japan and part of Tokyo-fu which existed from 1 May 1889 until its merger with its prefecture on 1 July 1943. The historical boundaries of Tokyo City are now occupied by the Special Wards of Tokyo.  The new merged government became what is now Tokyo, also known as the Tokyo Metropolis, or, ambiguously, Tokyo Prefecture.

History

In 1868, the medieval city of Edo, seat of the Tokugawa government, was renamed Tokyo, and the offices of Tokyo Prefecture (-fu) were opened. The extent of Tokyo Prefecture was initially limited to the former Edo city, but rapidly augmented to be comparable with the present Tokyo Metropolis. In 1878, the Meiji government's reorganization of local governments subdivided prefectures into counties or districts (gun, further subdivided into towns and villages, later reorganized similar to Prussian districts) and districts or wards (ku) which were in ordinary prefectures cities as a whole, e.g. today's Hiroshima City (-shi) was then Hiroshima-ku; the three major cities of Tokyo, Osaka and Kyoto were each subdivided into several such wards. In Tokyo Prefecture, this created 15 wards (listed below) and six counties/districts.

In 1888, the central government created the legal framework for the current system of cities (shi) that granted some basic local autonomy rights – with some similarities to Prussia's system of local self-government as Meiji government advisor Albert Mosse heavily influenced the organization of local government. But under a special imperial regulation, Tokyo City, like Kyoto City and Osaka City, initially did not maintain a separate mayor; instead, the (appointed) governor of Tokyo Prefecture served as mayor of Tokyo City. The Tokyo city council/assembly (Tōkyō-shikai) was first elected in May 1889. Each ward also retained its own assembly. City and prefectural government were separated in 1898., and the government began to appoint a separate mayor of Tokyo City in 1898, but retained ward-level legislation, which continues to this day in the special ward system. From 1926, the mayor was elected by the elected city council/assembly from its own ranks. The city hall of Tokyo was located in the Yūrakuchō district, on a site now occupied by the Tokyo International Forum.

Tokyo became the second-largest city in the world (population 4.9 million) upon absorbing several outlying districts in July 1932, giving the city a total of 35 wards.

In 1943, the city was abolished and merged with Tokyo Prefecture to form the Tokyo Metropolitan Government, which was functionally a part of the central government of Japan: the governor of Tokyo became a Cabinet minister reporting directly to the Prime Minister. This system remained in place until 1947 when the current structure of the Tokyo Metropolitan Government was formed.

Wards

See also

 Capital of Japan
 Politics of Tokyo City

References

Further reading
 Steiner, Kurt. (1965). Local Government in Japan

External links
 Historical Development of Japanese Local Governance

1889 establishments in Japan
Cities in Tokyo
Dissolved municipalities of Tokyo
History of Tokyo
Populated places disestablished in 1943
Populated places established in 1889
1943 disestablishments in Japan